Harlev is a former railway town in Aarhus Municipality in Denmark, with a population of 3,990 as of 1 January 2022. It is a suburb only 13 kilometres west of central Aarhus and is located at the Danish national road 15.

History 

Harlev developed as a railway town in 1902 when a train station of the former Hammelbanen rail road line was built on a field between the villages of Gammel Harlev and Framlev. Harlev church is still situated 1½ kilometre out of town in the older settlement of Gammel Harlev (lit.: Old Harlev). Hammelbanen formerly connected the inland town of Hammel with the port city of Aarhus and was important for the transportation of agricultural products, but it was decommissioned in 1956. The former train station in Harlev has since been restored and is currently headquarters to a local scouting group. Because of the position between Gammel Harlev and Framlev, the citizens of Harlev is still divided between the parishes of Harlev and Framlev.

Gammel Harlev 
The village of Gammel Harlev, situated at a bend of the Aarhus River 1½ km from Harlev, is a much older settlement. Harlev church has been dated to around 1100 AD, and is thus among the first churches in Denmark. Harlev watermill from 1733 is no longer active as a watermill, but has been restored and repurposed as a conference center.

The entire parish of Harlev was once part of the extensive Skanderborg Equestrian District (Skanderborg Rytterdistrikt) until 1784.

Notable people 
 Henrik Wann Jensen (born 1969 in Harlev) a Danish computer graphics researcher

References

Sources 
 Archive of local history

External links 

Towns and settlements in Aarhus Municipality
Cities and towns in Aarhus Municipality